The National Federation of Post Office Clerks (NFPOC) was a labor union representing clerks working in post offices in the United States.

History
At the start of the 20th century, the main union of post office clerks was the United National Association of Post Office Clerks (UNAPOC).  However, this was a conservative association, which distanced itself from the labor movement, and some locals, particularly in Chicago, instead affiliated directly to the American Federation of Labor (AFL).  On August 26, 1906, these locals formed the NFPOC, which was chartered by the AFL.  In 1917, it absorbed the Brotherhood of Railway Postal Clerks, and renamed itself as the National Federation of Postal Employees.  Two years later, it transferred the railway postal clerks to the Railway Mail Association and became the NFPOC once more.  By 1925, the union had nearly 40,000 members.

The union's membership grew to 95,000 by 1953.  It transferred to the new AFL-CIO in 1955.  On April 17, 1961, the union merged with UNAPOC to form the United Federation of Post Office Clerks.

Presidents
Leo E. George
J. Cline House

References

Postal trade unions
Trade unions established in 1906
Trade unions disestablished in 1961